The Institut Supérieur du Commerce (ISC Paris Business School), a business school located in Paris, is a French university-level institution (grande école). Its programs consist of a core degree, a bachelor's program offering six different specializations, a Master's degree in management according to the Bologna European higher education standards, and a MBA program offering sixteen different specializations. These courses are available both on a part-time and full-time basis.

ISC Paris's degrees are accredited by the French Ministry of Education and the Association to Advance Collegiate Schools of Business, a standard reached by only 5% of business schools worldwide reflecting its established international reputation for high quality graduates.

The Master in management and the MBA taught in 4 languages and 5 locations are accredited by the Association of MBAs. Only the top 2% of business schools in over 70 countries  received this accreditation.

The Master in Management is designated EFMD accredited Programme by the European Foundation for Management Development.

Subsequently, the Master in Management degree is triply accredited by the different international education alliances.

The Bachelor and Master degrees are accredited by the Business Graduates Association in January 2021.

For its Doctorate of Business Administration, ISC Paris Group becomes member of the Executive DBA Council in December 2021.

History
The ISC Paris business school was inaugurated in the autumn of 1963 at 6 avenue Léon Heuzey, in the 16th arrondissement of Paris. Founded by Paul Icard, director of the Institute of Industrial Sale Psychology, with the goal of training "business executives adapted to the methods of modern business." The ISC Paris was a non-profit association (law 1901) with a Board of Directors. Students were eligible for admission immediately after the earning their baccalaureate; initially the duration of study was two years. The first promotion (promo 64) was composed of thirty-eight male students. Founded in early 1963, the Board of Students of the ISC Paris directed student life and activities at the school. Extracurricular activities were a core part of the professional degrees. In 1969, the Board of Students separated from the school administration and incorporated as a separate, non-profit association. In 1970 the "Junior Enterprise" of the ISC Paris was founded.

On May 19, 1969, ISC Paris was recognized by the State in a ministerial decree. Simultaneously, it moved to new premises at 13 rue Jacques Bingen in the 17th arrondissement. The school had a student body of approximately one hundred students at the time. In 1971 the length of the course of study was increased by a year to three years. Also in 1971, admission to the school was closed to those who had only earned their baccalaureate, requiring an additional year of preparation. The same year admission to the Institut supérieur du commerce de Paris was opened to women.

In 1975, ISC Paris moved to its current location at 22 Boulevard du Fort de Vaux, occupying an area of 2200 m2 offering amenities such as a language laboratory, group study rooms, conference rooms, and a computer lab. The entry examination was thereafter opened to parallel admissions to students with 2 to 4-year post-baccalaureate university degrees. In 1976 there were nearly one thousand applicants to the business school. ISC Paris subsequently chose to open examination centers in regional provinces with the support of local chambers of commerce and high schools.

On May 21, 1980, a decree of the Ministry of Education announced that the ISC Paris's degree was guaranteed by the State. In 1981 a Department for Continuing Professional Education was established, offering training solutions to businesses. This was followed by the creation of ISC Master Program for graduate students. The Institut Superieur du Commerce was rebranded as the ISC Group. In 1983, the entry examination in the first year was opened to applicants with a 2 years degree, in order to increase the pool of applicants. In October 1983, ISC Paris inaugurated new premises close to the Boulevard du Fort de Vaux. The school grounds expanded, eventually covering over 3000 m2.

The number of applicants to the ISC Paris increased as a result of the actions of the School Promotion Committee organizing conferences in preparatory classes across France. In 1992, ISC Paris created a series of examinations with a partner business school with identical written tests, but different oral exams for each school. This system lasted until 1999, when the ISC Paris decided to join the Banque Commune d'épreuves (Examination test base for most Business Schools). Meanwhile, in 1996, ministry-led reforms increased the duration of preparatory classes from one to two years. The number of candidates reached 1 178 in 1982, 2 281 in 1984 and 3 875 in 1992. In 2010, the number of applicants reached more than 2,900 applicants from HEC preparatory classes and about 2,700 via the parallel admission process in 2011.

In March 2007, the ISC Paris was authorized to award master's degree as part of the LMD Europe-wide Bologna process to its students by the Helfer Committee and joined the Conference of Grandes Ecoles.

As of September 2, 2019, Jean-Paul Aimetti is President of the Board of Directors and Jean-Christophe Hauguel is the Chief Executive Officer.

On October 19, 2019, The Business School joins the Principles for Responsible Management Education, an initiative by the United Nations Global Compact.

International memberships
AACSB, AMBA, EFMD, BGA, EDBAC, CampusFrance, NAFSA, FNEGE, Conférence des Grandes Ecoles and UGEI.

International
ISC Paris counts 151 partner universities in a total of 50 countries, offering 15 Master's level double diplomas. 54 nationalities on-campus. About 250 ISC Paris students enrolled in an exchange program abroad and 150 international exchange students registered at ISC Paris.

ARGENTINA : Universidad Blas Pascal - Universidad de Belgrano
AUSTRALIA : Charles Sturt University
AUSTRIA : Facchochschule des BFI Wien - FHWN Wiener Neustadt U.A.S.
BELGIUM: Universiteit Gent New - University College Ghent
BRAZIL : Centro Universitario Jorge Amado - PUC Campinas - UNESP Universidad Estadual Paulista - Universidade de Caxias do Sul - Universidade de Fortaleza UNIFOR - Universidade Federal do Rio de Janeiro - Universidade Federal Fluminense
BULGARIA : University of National and World Economy
CANADA : Concordia University - McGill University - Université du Québec à Montréal - Wilfrid Laurier University
CHILE : Universidad Autónoma de Chile - Universidad de Los Andes - Universidad de Valparaiso
CHINA : Beijing University of Technology - Hong Kong Baptist University - Lingnan University - Shanghaï Institute of Foreign Trade - Shanghaï Normal University - The Hong-Kong Polytechnic University - UIBE University of International Business & Economics
COLOMBIA : Pontificia Universidad Javeriana
CYPRIUS : University of Cyprus
CZECH REPUBLIC : Brno University of Technology - Jan Amos Komensky University
DENMARK : Copenhagen Business School - Roskilde University - University of Southern Denmark
ECUADOR : Universidad del Pacífico - Universidad Espíritu Santo 
EGYPT : Misr University
ESTONIA : Tallinn University of Technology
FINLAND : Helsinki Metropolia University of Applied Sciences - HUMAK University of Applied Sciences - Laurea University of Applied Sciences - University of Vaasa
GERMANY : Berlin School of Economics and Law New - FH Mainz University of Applied Sciences - HHL Leipzig Graduate School - Justus Liebig University - Karslruhe University of Applied Sciences - Munich Business School - Universität Hamburg - University of Konstanz - Wiesbaden Business School (Hochschule RheinMain UAS)
HUNGARY : Budapest Business School - Corvinus University of Budapest - University of Pécs
INDIA : Indian Institute of Finance
INDONESIA : Binus University
IRELAND : Athlone Institute of Technology - Griffith College Dublin - Institute of Technology Tralee - University College Cork
ITALY : Università Cattolica Del Sacro Cuore - Universita degli studi di Genova - Universita degli studi di Trento - Universita degli studi di Trieste
JAPAN : Kansai Gaidai University - Meiji University - Ritsumeikan Asia Pacific University
LATVIA : Turiba School of Business Administration 
LITHUANIA : ISM University of Management & Economics - Mykolas Romeris University - Vilnius University – International Business School - Vytautas Magnus University
MALAYSIA : Universiti Malaya - Universiti Teknologi Malaysia
MEXICO : Universidad de Guadalajara - Universidad de La Salle – Mexico - Universidad de La Salle – Morelia - Universidad Panamericana
NETHERLANDS : Hogeschool Utrecht - Hogeschool Zuyd - Noordelijke Hogeschool Leeuwarden
NEW ZEALAND : University of Waikato
NORWAY : Trondheim Business School - University of Agder
PERU : Universidad Peruana de Ciencias Applicadas - Universidad San Ignacio de Loyola
PHILIPPINES : Saint Louis University
POLAND : Karol Adamiecki – University of economics - Kozminski University - Olympus University - Warsaw School of Economics (SGH) - WSB Poznan School of Banking
PORTUGAL : Universidad dos Açores - Universidade Técnica de Lisboa (ISEG)	 
ROMANIA : Academy of Economic Studies in Bucharest
RUSSIA : MIRBIS Moscow International Higher Business School - Moscow Academy of Economics and Law (MAEL Moscow) - Saint Petersburg State University– Faculty of Economics - Saint Petersburg State University– School of International Relations
SLOVENIA : University of Ljubljana
SOUTH KOREA : Chung Ang University - Ewha University - Hanyang University - KDI School of Public Management - Korea University - Sangmyung University - Seoul National University - Sogang University - Sookmyung University - The Catholic University of Korea - Yonsei University
SPAIN: Universidad Católica de Valencia - Universidad CEU San Pablo Madrid - Universidad de Barcelona - Universidad de Navarra - Universidad de León − Universidad de Zaragoza
SWEDEN: Södertörn University - Stockholm University - University of Gothenburg - University of Linköping
SWITZERLAND: Bern University of Applied Sciences − Haute Ecole de Gestion de Genève − International University in Geneva − University of Applied Sciences Northwestern - ZHAW School of Management and Law 	
TAIWAN: Feng Chia University − Ming Chuan University − National Chengchi University − National Sun Yat-Sen University - Yuanpei University
THAILAND: Chulalongkorn University − Dhurakij Pundit University − Thammasat University	 
TUNISIA: Institut des Hautes Etudes Commerciales (IHEC) 	
TURKEY: Istanbul University - Sabançi University − Yasar University	 
UNITED KINGDOM: Regent's College London - University of Bath − Westminster University
UNITED STATES: Baylor University − California State University - Louisiana Tech University - Purdue University − The University of Mississippi - The University of Texas at Brownsville and Texas Southmost College − University of Northern Iowa 	
URUGUAY: Universidad de la Empresa (UDE)

Research
Research at ISC Paris has four independent laboratories in :
 Finance, information systems, law and economics
 Consumption and well-being
 Management, entrepreneurship and Strategy
 Decision Learning
The department is advised by a scientific committee. The ISC Paris is developing a doctoral program with the University of Cergy-Pontoise. It publishes quarterly research papers in all areas of business and organizes conferences such as the International Finance Conference with other academic partners and professional associations such as the University of Cergy-Pontoise, the REMEREG Network, the AFFI.

Degree programs
 Bachelor in Business program
 "Grandes Ecoles" program, master's degree
 Master's of Business Administration program

Specializations
Marketing, Communication and Commercial Relationships department
 Commercial Relations Management  
 Digital Marketing & E-Business
 Marketing Strategy
 Luxury Business Marketing Management 
 Market Studies Management 
(Double master's degrees with the ISC Paris & the University of Cergy-Pontoise UCP)

Management department
 Entrepreneurship
 Innovation in European Business 
(Double master's degrees with the ISC Paris, the University College Cork and University of applied sciences Utrecht)
 Information Systems Management 
 Procurement and Supply Chain Management
 International Business and Management
 Management of commercial relationships
 Human Resource Management
 Information Technology Management and Modelling
(Double master's degrees with the ISC Paris & the University of Cergy-Pontoise UCP)
 Management of sustainable performance 
(Double master's degrees with the ISC Paris & the Conservatoire National des Arts et Métiers)
 Sustainable Development and Global Quality Management 
(Double master's degrees with the ISC Paris & the Conservatoire National des Arts et Métiers)

Audit and Finance
 Legal and tax expertise 
 Finance
 International and Corporate Finance
 Expertise Audit and Control (validation of 5 out of 7 exams of the Diplôme Supérieur de Comptabilité et Gestion)
 Financial Risk Management
(Double master's degrees with the ISC Paris & the University of Cergy-Pontoise UCP)
 Financial Instrument Management
(Double master's degrees with the ISC Paris & the University of Cergy-Pontoise UCP)

Student activities
Asides academic education, ISC Paris emphasizes entrepreneurship and initiative taking through more than 20 Junior Enterprises that have their own budget and are integrated in the pedagogy since the early years of the business school. The focus and the activities of these organizations may shift over the years and according to initiatives and opportunities.

Sports & Adventure 
 BUREAU DES SPORTS (BDS) offers sports to all students and organises events.
 ISC MOTORS focuses on mechanical sports and to road prevention.
 BUREAU DES ARTS (BDA) promotes art and educates students from ISC Paris to culture and artistic environment.

Humanitarian & Social
 AIDE MONDIALE organises humanitarian operations internationally. 
 SOLIRACE prevents young people against AIDS. 
 HUMAN provides tutoring, liveliness in hospitals to underprivileged and disabled children.

Culture, Art & Multimedia
 STUDIO organises events related to luxury goods and fashion. 
 VISUAL reports all the events at ISC Paris. 
 EVO educates students from ISC Paris to new technologies.
 WAVING as a communication agency, leads a consulting activity for students and companies.
 ISC MEDIA produces some TV content and receives famous guests from politics, media...

Services to Businesses and Students
 PARTNER'ISC helps students build their professional projects, liaising with partners and alumni. 
 YOUR provides marketing services for companies.  
 CHALLENGE is an ISC Paris ambassador by taking part to national and international competitions organized by large companies. 
 COSMOPOL offers internships abroad to students and welcomes international students. 
 ISC NETWORK provides punctual and regular jobs for students. 
 PROCOM promotes ISC Paris by organizing exhibitions and forums. 
 BUREAU DES ELEVES, in relation with the management of the school coordinates and monitors the projects of each of the junior enterprises.

Ranking
National

There are about 200 business schools in France of which nearly fifty are authorized to award Master's degrees. Among these business schools, the ISC Paris School of Management is usually ranked between 8th and 25th in publications such as the daily newspaper "le Figaro" and the magazine Challenges depending on the criteria used.

International

The Master in Management is ranked 85th worldwide in 2019 by the Financial Times.

ISC Paris is ranked 88th in the top European Business Schools in 2019 by the Financial Times.

The MBA is ranked 201+ worldwide in the World University Rankings - Full Time MBA in 2021   and 61+ in Europe in the World University Rankings - Full Time MBA in 2021  by Quacquarelli Symonds.

The Executive MBA is ranked 16+ in Asia, 2nd worldwide on the Executive Profile criteria and 141-150 globally in the World University Rankings - Executive MBA in 2021 by Quacquarelli Symonds.

The Master in Management is ranked 34th worldwide in 2021 by the Economist.

Alumni
The alumni association of ISC Paris was established in 1962 with more than 20,000 members today. As of 2010, there are 25 alumni in the Who's Who.

Notes

External links
 ISC Paris official website
ISC Paris Website in English
 The ISC alumni association (AAEISC)
Master of Management
 Institut Supérieur du Commerce, Paris (ISC)
 Association des Anciens Elèves de l'ISC (AAEISC)
   Département Recherche de l'ISC
 3èmes cycles et MBA de l'ISC

Business schools in France
Schools in Paris
Buildings and structures in the 17th arrondissement of Paris
Educational institutions established in 1963
Grandes écoles
1963 establishments in France